Arnot Mall is a shopping mall located in Big Flats, New York, in Chemung County.
As of 2022, the mall currently maintains the traditional chains JCPenney, and Burlington. The mall currently features popular brands such as Bath and Body Works, American Eagle, and Talbot's.

The malls located at 3300 Chambers Road (Chemung County Route 35) and operated by Spinoso Real Estate Group. Arnot Mall is located along the Southern Tier Expressway (Interstate 86/NY Route 17) at Exit 51A between Corning and Elmira. It is open seven days a week and has over 100 stores in all, including a food court and a Regal Cinemas 10.

The mall maintains a Regal Cinema. Arnot Mall is a "super regional" mall, serving mainly New York's Southern Tier and Finger Lakes Region.

History
Arnot Mall opened in 1967 as "The Mall" Shopping Center, at which time it had only 40 stores and JCPenney as the original anchor. The mall took its name from its original developer, Arnot Realty. Several anchors have changed names in the mall's history, the most recent being Burlington Coat Factory, which opened in 2006 in a former Bradlees. Other former anchor stores include Hess's (which became Kaufmann's in 1995 and Macy's in 2006), and Iszard's (later McCurdy's, then The Bon-Ton).

For the 2011 school year, all Pennsylvania Real Estate Investment Trust owned malls, including Arnot Mall, gave away free school supplies with a purchase of at least $75. Racecar driver Jeff Gordon was spotted in the Arnot Mall arcade on Saturday, August 13 after a race on August 8 at Watkins Glen International. Later that day, Robby Gordon gave out signatures outside of GNC. Employees of the mall said they felt the 2011 Virginia earthquake that affected much of the northeastern United States.

The late 2010's saw multiple classic chain anchors retreat from brick and morter after being challenged by digital retailers in recent years.

In 2016, it was announced Macy's will close and become The Bon-Ton. 

In 2018, it was announced that The Bon-Ton would close as a result of filing for bankruptcy.

In 2020, it was announced that Sears would be closing.

References

External links
Website

Shopping malls in New York (state)
Shopping malls established in 1967